The Jinbei Haixing X30 is a 8-seater minivan produced by Chinese car manufacturer Brilliance Auto under the Jinbei brand.

Overview

The Jinbei Haixing X30 was released by Brilliance Auto in August, 2013. Built by Brilliance Xinyuan Chongqing Auto (华晨鑫源), the Chongqing branch of Brilliance Auto, the Jinbei X30, originally known as Haixing X30, was developed as the flagship in the Haixing commercial van lineup. 

When launched in the market in August 2013, the Jinbei Haixing X30 was originally sold as the Jinbei Small Haise X30, despite not having any real connection with the Toyota-Hiace-based Shenyang-made Jinbei Haise vans. Prices of the Jinbei X30 ranges from 35,000 yuan to 46,800 yuan.

References

External links

Jinbei official site

Minivans
Rear-wheel-drive vehicles
X30
Cars introduced in 2013